Ford Airport may refer to:

 Ford Airport (Iron Mountain) in Iron Mountain, Michigan, United States (FAA/IATA: IMT)
 Ford Airport (Dearborn) in Dearborn, Michigan, United States (closed 1947)
 Gerald R. Ford International Airport in Grand Rapids, Michigan, United States (FAA/IATA: GRR)
 Wendell H. Ford Airport in Hazard, Kentucky, United States (FAA: K20)
 RNAS Ford, former RAF airfield now the site of Ford Open Prison